Tobera airfield was an aerodrome located near Tobera, near Keravat, East New Britain, Papua New Guinea. The airfield was constructed by the imperial Japan during World War II (during August 1943). Tobera was later neutralized by Allied air bombing from 1944. The airfield was abandoned after the cessation of hostilities.

Japanese units based at Tobera airfield
Kanoya Kōkūtai (G4M1 Betty)
201st Kōkūtai (A6M Zero)
253rd Kōkūtai (A6M Zero)
Zuikaku detachment (A6M Zero)
105th Air Force (A6M Zero)

Further reading

External links
http://www.pacificwrecks.com/airfields/png/tobera/index.html

Transport in Papua New Guinea
Airports in Papua New Guinea
East New Britain Province